Medals awarded for the skeleton discipline at the 1948 Winter Olympics held in St Moritz. At that time the sport was called cresta, and St. Moritz had the most famous Cresta Run, dating to 1884. In many locations the sport was referred to as tobogganing during these and the 1928 Games. The contest was run over a total of six runs.

Medalists

Turn 10 at Cesana Pariol, where the bobsled, luge, and skeleton competitions took place for the 2006 Winter Olympics in Turin, Italy, is named for Bibbia.

John Heaton also won the silver medal in skeleton at the 1928 Winter Olympics.

Results

Medal table

References
1948 skeleton results
Austrian Olympic Committee results on 1948 skeleton 

Skeletonsport.com results

 
1948 Winter Olympics events
1948
1948 in skeleton